The 5th Troop Carrier Squadron is an inactive United States Air Force squadron. Its last assignment was with Tenth Air Force at Selfridge Field, Michigan, where it was inactivated on 27 June 1949.

The squadron served as a training unit during the Second World War until it was disbanded in a general reorganization of Army Air Forces training units.  It was reactivated briefly after the war in the United States Air Force Reserve.

History
The squadron was an operational training unit prior to December 1942.  It then served as a replacement training for glider crews.  It also provided training for army airborne units, and ferried gliders from 1943 until disbanded in 1944.

The squadron was again activated in the reserve in 1947, but does not appear to have been fully manned or equipped before inactivating in 1949.

Lineage
  Constituted as the 5th Transport Squadronon 1 October 1933
 Constituted on 1 October 1939
 Activated on 14 October 1939
 Redesignated 5th Troop Carrier Squadron on 4 July 1942
 Disbanded on 14 April 1944
 Reconstituted on 25 August 1947
 Activated in the reserve on 15 September 1947
 Inactivated on 27 June 1949

Assignments
 10th Transport Group (later 10th Troop Carrier Group), 14 October 1939 – 14 April 1944 (attached to 314th Troop Carrier Group, 22 February-8 April 1943)
 Second Air Force, 15 September 1947
 Tenth Air Force, 1 July 1948
 First Air Force, 15 August 1948
 433d Troop Carrier Group, 28 October 1948
 Tenth Air Force, 28 March-27 June 1949

Stations
 Patterson Field, Ohio, 14 October 1939
 General Billy Mitchell Field, Wisconsin, 25 May 1942
 Pope Field, North Carolina, 4 October 1942
 Lawson Field, Georgia, 2 December 1942
 Grenada Army Air Field, Mississippi, 26 January 1944
 Alliance Army Air Field, Nebraska, c. 12 March-14 April 1944
 Selfridge Field, Michigan, 15 September 1947 – 27 June 1949

Aircraft
 Douglas C-33, 1939-1942
 Douglas C-39, 1939-1942
 Douglas C-47 Skytrain, 1941–1944
 Douglas C-53 Skytrooper, 1943–1944
 Aeronca L-3 Grasshopper, 1943
 Piper L-4 Grasshopper, 1943

References

Notes

Bibliography

 
 

005
005
Military units and formations established in 1942
Military units and formations disestablished in the 1940s